Basilio Padrón (born 12 May 1928) is a former professional footballer who played in the Argentine Primera División and La Liga.

Career
Born in Buenos Aires, Padrón began playing football as a striker with local side Club Atlético Platense. In 1951, he moved to Ecuador where he participated in the first Campeonato Profesional de Fútbol de Guayaquil with Club Sport Río Guayas. He had a spell in Venezuela with La Salle FC before moving to Spain to play in La Liga with CF Valencia and UD Las Palmas.

References

External links
 

1928 births
Living people
Argentine footballers
Club Atlético Platense footballers
Valencia CF players
UD Las Palmas players
Association football forwards
Footballers from Buenos Aires